Ilounga Pata (born 12 November 2000) is a Sint Maartener professional footballer who plays as a defender for Eerste Divisie club TOP Oss and the Sint Maarten national team.

Career
Pata is a former youth academy player of Alphense Boys and ADO Den Haag. He joined youth academy of Huddersfield Town in July 2019. In August 2021, he joined Dutch Eerste Divisie club TOP Oss. He made his professional debut for the club on 10 September 2021 in a 3–3 draw against ADO Den Haag.

Career statistics

Club

International

References

External links
 

2000 births
Living people
Association football defenders
Sint Maarten footballers
Sint Maarten international footballers
Eerste Divisie players
TOP Oss players